The Suburban Conference (formally the St Louis Suburban Public High School Athletic and Activities Association) is a Missouri State High School Activities Association recognized high school extracurricular league located in the suburbs of St. Louis. There are 31 schools in the Suburban Conference, making it one of the largest high school athletics conferences in the state of Missouri. The conference comprises mostly schools in St. Louis County but also a handful from Jefferson County.

Because of the large number of teams in the conference, the conference is divided geographically into sub-conferences, and divisions. Prior to the 2014-15 school year, there were four conferences - Suburban East, Suburban North, Suburban South and Suburban West.

Realignments
For the 2014-15 seasons, the conference was re-aligned into three sub-conferences, each with two divisions.

In 2018, the St. Louis Suburban Public High School Athletic and Activities Association re-aligned their three conferences into various pools by sport, essentially making the sub-conferences and divisions irrelevant, as a given school competes against a different pool of schools in various sports. For purposes of athletic competition, pool assignments are based on the following factors:  athletics offered, competitive balance, competitive trends, diversity, and school size. The number of pools varies from two (boys' volleyball) to five (football), depending on the sport, with most sports having three or four pools.

List of member schools
Schools are listed in alphabetical order.

References

External links 
  Official website

High school sports conferences and leagues in the United States
Missouri high school athletic conferences